The 2023 OFC U-17 Championship was an international football tournament held in Fiji from 11 to 28 January 2023 for under 17 players. The nine national teams involved in the tournament were required to register a squad of up to 26 players, including two goalkeepers. Only players in these squads are eligible to take part in the tournament. The two finalists of the tournament qualify for the 2023 FIFA U-17 World Cup.

The age listed for each player is on 11 January 2023, the first day of the tournament. The numbers of caps and goals listed for each player do not include any matches played after the start of tournament. The nationality for each club reflects the national association (not the league) to which the club is affiliated. A flag is included for coaches that are of a different nationality than their own national team. The preliminary squads were announced by Oceania Football Confederation on 9 January 2023.

Group A

Fiji
 Coach: Sunil Kumar

Savenaca Nabati
Waisea Nagonelevu
Sahil Deo
Aron Naicker
Isimeli Gavidi
Luke Vakavotu
Prashant Kumar
Richard Swami
Sailimone Ravonokula
Ibraheem Afazal
Delon Shankar
Watisoni Batirerega
Peni Misipopi
Vilikesa Vosagaga
Neeraj Sharma
William Khan
Jacob Seninawanawa
Petero Maivalenisau
Nirav Nihal Kumar
Vinayak Rao
Kartik Sharma
Ilisoni Koro
Areya Khrish Prasad

Samoa
 Coach: Desmond Edward

Kirk Auvele
Aukuso Ah Far
Setefano Kamilo
Faapaia Asia
Mitchell Mcilraith
Isaiah Afamasaga
Mike Salanoa
Tomoteo Lesatele
Rory Tanuvasa
Ethelbert Edward
Kingston Vaitusi
Ariyon Hakai
Lomitusi Scanlan
Jason Goble-lote
Pita Tiatia
Ornan Tamasese
Alex Malauulu
Cayden Steffener
Pharrell Trainor
Malakye Paterson
Laveaina Sakaio
Talalelei Taituuga

Tonga
 Coach: Lui Muavesi

Siosiua Moimoi
Nikolasi Vakatapu
Viliami Moli
Sione Talia’uli
Isimoto Vaihu
Tevita Falepapalangi
Va’inga Teu
Ulafala Sonasi
Vilikisepi Tai
Viliami Finau
Alexander Hola
Puluno Kafoa
Penisimani Tokelau
Atieli ‘Aho
Maloni Manu’olevao
Sione Taufa
Siosiua ‘Eeteaki
Sione Tu’ungafasi
Sione Latu
Malakai Sili
Senituli Fakahau
Tevita Pale
Sione Kaitapu

Group B

American Samoa
 Coach: Ruben Luvu

Felise Fata
August Grey
Samu Emani
Pedro Kuresa
Pela Scanlan
Robert Coulter
Dylan Salapu
Malofou Leatualevao
Ben Tofeaono
Johnica Collins
Elson Utoaluga
Fiamatai Itamua
Richard Niko
Daniel Lee
Stidolph Maile
Setefano Tuailemafua
Edward Loke
Ajalon Fuimaono
Alex Maee

New Caledonia
 Coach: Léonardo Lopez

Claude Tiaouniane
Ronald Nganyane
Maël Raban-Grangier
Grégory Diko
Wadria Hanye
Joseph Hnaissilin
Amin Belghecham
Anthony Levy
David Cahma
Nolhann Alebate
Landry Thupako
Jythrim Upa
Simon Ue
Numa Pamani
Bayron Gohoupe
Yann Saulia
Sipane Qaeze
Jean-Philippe Angexetine
Iwatro Hmuine
Timotei Zeter
Yazid-Enzo Wajoka
Doryan Etienne
Maximilian Dabome
Kyllian Wiako
Jean-yves Saiko
Ininë Huna

New Zealand
New Zealand announced their squad on 14 December 2022.

 Coach:  Martin Bullock

Group C

Cook Islands
 Coach: Tahiri Elikana

Robert Savage
Ioane Bbrogan
Paulo Allsworth
Timi Kiriau
Tione Nand
Shane Tuteru
Christpher Pita
Dallas Rongokea
Teariki Ringi
Jeremiah Williams
Juleo Tauu
Stanley Tutai
Tamuera Newhnam
Akai Tuakeu
Hyrum Numanga
Iaveta Remuera
Terepai Karan
Jordan Matapo
Dwayne Matapo
Teina Ngametua

Tahiti
 Coach: Raiarii Golhen

Keahi Tenania
Manua Brillant
Hitimoana Teuira
Keanu Lecoutre
Ariiheivarau Tama
Tuarii Rota
Tahiarii Teriitemataua
Turerearii Vonbalou
Titouan Guillemant
Tiahiti Colombani
Noarii Cuneo
Dylan Hutia
Vaitea Seguy
Thibaut Geny
Hikutini Tamarii
Niuhau Firiapu
Kanoa Barsinas
Eden Cadousteau
Keanan Faure
Teriitaumatatini Martin
Argan Clodic-Boucher

Vanuatu
 Coach: Emerson Alcantara

Joseph Nakou
Timothy Arukesa
Albert Timothy
Junierno Loli
Jean Patriano Natou
Aron Kalotang
Simon Takonavakalo
Paul Takaro
Augustine Chilia
Yan Chilia
Joseph Carlot
Ciciniho Tasso
Johnathan Kakor
Brian Tomkor
Joseph Anganaboe
Damien Tari
Renox Tatalae
Jeffe Willy
Delickson Judah
Jimmy Moso
Romain Luake
Jim Peter
Jeremy Tasso Masso
Jesse Kapala

References 

2022–23 in OFC football